This is a list of British television related events from 1947.

Events

January
No events.

February
10 February–11 March – The BBC Television Service is temporarily suspended for the first time since World War II due to the Winter 1946–47 UK fuel shortage caused by the severe winter. From 21 February, two issues of the Radio Times, the BBC's listings magazine, are missed for the same cause.

March – October
No events.

November
9 November – Memorial service broadcast from the Cenotaph on the BBC Television Service, using tele-recording for the first time.
20 November – The Princess Elizabeth (later Elizabeth II), daughter of George VI marries The Duke of Edinburgh at Westminster Abbey, London. The procession is watched by an estimated 400,000 viewers and is the oldest surviving telerecorded programme in Britain.

December
No events.

Unknown 
Adelaide Hall appears in Variety in Sepia, the first telecording by BBC (kinescope) showing black singer Adelaide Hall performing two songs with chorus and her guitar. Copies of this first English kinescope of live TV broadcast are preserved by the BBC.
Café Continental premieres on the BBC Television Service.

Debuts
19 January – Rebecca (1947)
4 February – The Happiest Days of Your Life (1947)
6 February – The Two Mrs Carrolls (1947)
9 February – Cry Havoc (1947)
23 March – The Man Who Came To Dinner (1947)
11 May – Larry the Lamb (1947)
24 June – The Bad Man (1947)
27 July – Boys in Brown (1947)
3 August – The Amazing Dr. Clitterhouse (1947)
16 August – New Faces (1947)
31 August – The Green Pack (1947)
2 October – Busman's Honeymoon (1947)
Unknown – Café Continental (1947–1953)

Continuing television shows

1920s
BBC Wimbledon (1927–1939, 1946–2019, 2021–2024)

1930s
Picture Page (1936–1939, 1946–1952)
For the Children (1937–1939, 1946–1952)
The Boat Race (1938–1939, 1946–2019)
BBC Cricket (1939, 1946–1999, 2020–2024)

1940s
Kaleidoscope (1946–1953)
Muffin the Mule (1946–1955, 2005–2006)

Ending this year
Pinwright's Progress (1946–1947)

Births
 21 January – Jonathan Meades, journalist and presenter
 10 February – Nicholas Owen, journalist and newsreader
 22 February – Deborah Grant, actress
 28 February – Stephanie Beacham, English actress
 1 March – Mike Read, television presenter and radio disc jockey
 11 March – Alan Yentob, television executive
 26 April – Warren Clarke, actor (died 2014)
 30 April – Leslie Grantham, actor (EastEnders) (died 2018)
 20 May – Greg Dyke, journalist and broadcaster, Director-General of the BBC
 22 May – G. F. Newman, screenwriter and producer
 6 July – Richard Beckinsale, actor (Porridge, Rising Damp) (died 1979)
 14 July – Julia Somerville, journalist and newsreader
 23 July – David Essex, actor and singer (EastEnders)
 7 August – Nick Ross, radio and television presenter
 14 September – Joan Thirkettle, journalist and broadcaster (died 1996)
 16 September – Russ Abbot, actor, comedian and singer
 28 September – Jon Snow, journalist and news presenter
 30 September – Rula Lenska, actress
 1 October – Larry Lamb, actor
 2 October – Paul Jackson, producer
 18 October – Paul Chuckle (Elliott), half of children's entertainment comedy double act the Chuckle Brothers 
 1 November – Nick Owen, newsreader and presenter
 6 November – Jim Rosenthal, sports presenter
 Alistair Beaton, scriptwriter

See also
 1947 in British music
 1947 in the United Kingdom
 List of British films of 1947

References